Ightenhill is a civil parish in the borough of Burnley, Lancashire, England.  The parish contains 15 buildings that are recorded in the National Heritage List for England as designated listed buildings.   Of these, two are listed at Grade I, the highest of the three grades, and the others are at Grade II, the lowest grade.  The parish is partly rural, and partly residential as a district of the town of Burnley.  The most notable buildings in the parish are Gawthorpe Hall and its Great Barn.  These are both listed, as are structures associated with them.  The other listed buildings include a farmhouse dating from the 16th century, a former schoolmaster's house, a parish church and its churchyard wall, a drinking fountain, and two boundary stones.

Key

Buildings

References

Citations

Sources

Buildings and structures in Burnley
Lists of listed buildings in Lancashire